Landgrave Otto of Hessen-Kassel (24 December 1594 in Kassel – 7 August 1617 in Hersfeld), was hereditary prince of Hesse-Kassel and administrator of Hersfeld Abbey. He predeceased his father.

Life 
Otto was the eldest son of Landgrave Maurice of Hesse-Kassel (1572-1632) from his marriage to Agnes (1578-1602), the daughter of Count John George of Solms-Laubach. Poet Hermann Kirchner, later professor of rhetoric at the University of Marburg, wrote a poem to mark Otto's birthday. The Ottoneum, built in Kassel by Maurice in 1603, was the first theater building constructed in Germany. Maurice named it after his son. 

Otto and his siblings were educated by his father. In 1606 he became the lay administrator of Hersfeld Abbey, which by then was a Lutheran institution. After completing his studies at the University of Marburg, Otto made a Grand Tour. He was in England from 23 June to 7 August 1611, with a retinue of about thirty, and was among the potential suitors of Princess Elizabeth. (She later married Otto's second cousin Frederick V of the Palatinate.) As Otto's father was known as a skislled composer, music played a large part of the entertainment. John Milton, the poet's father, composed a song in four parts, for which the landgrave presented him with a gold medal.

When he returned, his father involved him in the business of government.

In 1617, he suffered from the German measles.  He had a fever and from his sickbed, he tried to shoot a barking dog, which annoyed him.  He missed so badly that he hit himself in the chest and died.  He was buried in the Lutheran St. Mary's church in Marburg.

Marriages and issue 
In Kassel on 24 August 1613 Otto married firstly Catherine Ursula (b. Schloss Karlsburg, 19 June 1593 - d. Marburg, 15 February 1615), daughter of George Frederick, Margrave of Baden-Durlach. She died after giving birth a still-born son.

In Dessau on 14 June 1617 Otto married secondly Agnes Magdalene of Anhalt-Dessau (b. Dessau, 29 March 1590 - d. Eschwege, 24 October 1626), daughter of John George I, Prince of Anhalt-Dessau. This marriage was childless.

Otto left a son born out of wedlock:
 Ernest Reinhard of Hattenbach (b. posthumously Hachborn, 17 December 1617 - d. Rodenberg, 1 April 1694), married in 1669 to Anna Katharina of Hake (d. 1707).

Ancestors

Notes

References 
 Christian Röth: Geschichte von Hessen p. 255 ff
 Christoph von Rommel: Geschichte von Hessen p. 324 ff

1594 births
1617 deaths
Landgraves of Hesse-Kassel
17th-century German people
Heirs apparent who never acceded
Sons of monarchs